Chittaranjan Palace is a lesser-known palace at Mysore that was originally built for a princess of the Mysore royal family. It presently houses the "Green Hotel". It is a small hotel with 31 rooms and is eco-friendly (solar power, no AC, no TV, etc.). The profits from the hotel are given to charity.

History
Chittaranjan Palace was built by the Maharaja of Mysore for his sister in 1916. The palace was sold to a Mysorean family who then converted it into the headquarters of a film company, "Premier Studios". Many films and TV shows were shot, including the famous TV serial The Sword of Tipu Sultan. The studio was closed down after a fire broke out but was still owned and operated by the same family that owned Premier Studio. The building was used as a private residence until it was converted into a hotel, called "Green Hotel" in the 1970s. The same family still has a major stake in the hotel and the residence as a whole.

See also
List of Heritage Buildings in Mysore

References

External links
 

Kingdom of Mysore
Palaces in Mysore
Hotels in Mysore
1861 establishments in British India